Christopher Neal Jackson (born September 30, 1975) is an American actor, singer, musician, and composer. He began his career in 1995 starring in the Off-Broadway musical Time and the Wind by composer Galt MacDermot at the age of 20. He made his Broadway debut in 1997 as an ensemble member in the original Broadway cast of Disney's The Lion King. He remained with the show for several years, ultimately taking over the role of Simba. He went on to perform leading roles in several more Broadway musicals and plays, including After Midnight, Bronx Bombers, Holler If Ya Hear Me, and Memphis. He drew critical acclaim in several projects with Lin-Manuel Miranda: originating the roles of Benny in In the Heights and George Washington in the smash hit Hamilton. For the latter role he was nominated for a Tony Award for Best Featured Actor in a Musical. He also collaborated with Miranda on the Disney film Moana in which he provides the singing voice of Chief Tui. His other film work includes secondary roles in After.Life and Tracers.

Jackson starred as Chunk Palmer in the main cast of the CBS television drama Bull between 2016-2022. His other television work includes the recurring role of Perry Loftus in the HBO prison drama Oz and guest appearances on Fringe, Gossip Girl, Nurse Jackie, The Good Wife and White Collar. Also active as a film and television composer, he won a Daytime Emmy Award for Outstanding Original Song for "What I Am"  for the children's television program Sesame Street. He has also written music for LL Cool J, Sean Kingston, and will.i.am. In 2018, Jackson received an Honorary Doctor of Fine Arts from Oglethorpe University in Atlanta, Georgia.

Early life and education 
Born in Metropolis, Illinois, and raised in Cairo, Illinois, by his mother, Jane Adams, a vocal music teacher, and stepfather Herbert Michael Hodges. In 1993 he graduated from Cairo High School. While a student there, he performed in plays and was encouraged to pursue a career as an actor by one of his high school teachers, Lynn Steveson, who also led the school's debate team of which Jackson was a part. She also cast him in a production of Arthur Miller's The Crucible. He credits Pilots basketball coach Larry Baldwin and Pastor Larry Potts of Mighty Rivers Regional Worship Center as other important mentors during his formative years in Cairo.

After graduating from high school, Jackson attended the American Musical and Dramatic Academy in New York City.

Career
Jackson began his career in 1995 starring in the Off-Broadway musical Time and the Wind by composer Galt MacDermot of Hair fame. He made his Broadway debut in 1997 as an ensemble member and the understudy for Simba in the Original Broadway Cast of The Lion King. He later took over the role of Simba in 2000. He then did work in the theater scenes in Chicago and Minneapolis–Saint Paul, notably earning a BATC Award nomination for Best Actor for Beggar's Holiday in 2004 for and winning a Joseph Jefferson Award (Chicago's equivalent to the Tony Awards) in 2006 for Comfortable Shoes. In 2007 he returned to New York to join the cast of the Off-Broadway musical In the Heights as Benny. The cast won the 2007 Drama Desk Award for Outstanding Ensemble Performance. He continued with the show when it moved to Broadway in 2008.

In 2009 Jackson was tapped to write music for the revived children's television program The Electric Company. In 2012 he returned to Broadway as Delray in Memphis, and in 2013 he replaced Everett Bradley as "Diga Diga Doo" in the Broadway musical After Midnight. In 2013 he appeared as Derek Jeter and Bobby Sturges in the Eric Simonson's Off-Broadway play Bronx Bombers at Primary Stages. He remained with the production when it moved to Broadway in 2014. That same year he portrayed Vertus in the short lived Broadway musical Holler If Ya Hear Me which was based on the life of Tupac.

In 2015, Jackson originated the role of President George Washington in the musical Hamilton on Broadway. He was nominated for a Tony Award and concluded his run on November 13, 2016. Beginning with the 2016–2017 season, he plays Chunk Palmer in the CBS courtroom drama Bull. Jackson's film and TV work includes Moana, Tracers, The Good Wife, Person of Interest, A Gifted Man, and Nurse Jackie. He is also a member of hip-hop group Freestyle Love Supreme. He has been nominated for three Emmy Awards for composing music and lyrics for television; he won the “Outstanding Original Song” Emmy Award in 2011 for his lyrics to "What I Am," which he co-wrote for Sesame Street with Bill Sherman. The success led to a first look deal at CBS Studios.

In February 2021, Jackson signed with Nickelodeon to compose the NOGGIN SVOD original series Rhymes Through Times, which features Nick's preschool characters in a Broadway extravaganza recreating the stories of the greatest heroes of America, specifically focusing on Black history. The animation for the show was done by LionForge Animation LLC. who have previously worked on the Oscar®-winning Netflix movie Hair Love. The second season dropped on March 7, 2022.

Personal life
In 2004, after meeting through a production of In the Heights, Jackson married actress and singer Veronica. Before the first run-through of the Off-Broadway production of In the Heights, Jackson learned that his son had been diagnosed with autism. Jackson and his wife are advocates for KultureCity: a nonprofit promoting acceptance and inclusion of all individuals regardless of their abilities. They have one son, C. J., and one daughter, Jadelyn. They live in Scarsdale, New York.

Acting credits

Theatre

Film

Television

Discography

Awards and nominations

References

External links 
 
 

1975 births
Living people
20th-century American male actors
20th-century American singers
20th-century American male singers
21st-century American male actors
21st-century American singers
21st-century American male singers
People from Cairo, Illinois
Grammy Award winners
American male stage actors
American baritones
American male musical theatre actors
American male television actors
American male voice actors
American Musical and Dramatic Academy alumni